Zəngişalı (also, Zənkişalı and Zangishaly) is a village and municipality in the Agdam Rayon of Azerbaijan.  It has a population of 4,304.  The municipality consists of the villages of Zəngişalı and Mahrızlı.

References 

Populated places in Aghdam District